During the 1999–2000 English football season, Peterborough United Football Club competed in the Football League Third Division where they finished in 5th position on 78 points and gained promotion to the Football League Second Division via the play-offs.

Final league table

Results
Peterborough United's score comes first

Legend

Football League Division Three

Football League Division Three play-offs

League Cup

FA Cup

Football League Trophy

Squad

Appearances for competitive matches only

References

Peterborough United 1999–2000 at soccerbase.com (use drop down list to select relevant season)

See also
1999–2000 in English football

Peterborough United F.C. seasons
Peterborough United